Suck Out the Poison is the second full-length studio album by American rock band He Is Legend, released on October 3, 2006. It was produced and mixed by Steve Evetts. It received mixed reviews from long-time fans due to a major difference in vocalist Schuylar Croom's vocals. The FAQ section of their website addresses this:

Track listing 

"Mushroom River" and "Dixie Wolf (The Seduction Of...)" were originally posted on the band's Myspace and Purevolume pages to give fans a hint of what the album would be like. Soon before the CD's release, Stampede and Attack of the Dungeon Witch were also posted.

Personnel 
He Is Legend
 Schuylar Croom – vocals
 Adam Tanbouz – lead guitar, piano
 Matty Williams – bass guitar
 Steve Bache – drums, percussion
 McKenzie Bell – rhythm guitar

Additional musicians
 Laura Sweeney – guest vocals on "(((louds"

Production
He Is Legend – producer
Steve Evetts – producer, engineer, mixing
Alan Douches – mastering

Illustration and design
Invisible Creature – art direction
Ryan Clark – design
Colin Patrick Day – cover photo

References 

2006 albums
He Is Legend albums
Century Media Records albums
Solid State Records albums
Albums produced by Steve Evetts
Albums recorded at Sound City Studios